Japan national volleyball team may refer to:

 Japan men's national volleyball team
 Japan women's national volleyball team